Chloroclystis gerberae is a species of moth of the  family Geometridae. It is found in the Seychelles on the island of Mahé.

References

Herbulot, Cl. 1964a. Nouveaux Geometridae d'Aldabra. - Lambillionea 62:31–33

Chloroclystis
Moths described in 1964
Moths of Seychelles